The 1988 Australian Rally Championship was a series of rallying events held across Australia. It was the 21st season of the Australian Rally Championship. 

The series for 1988 had just four events, with Queenslanders Murray Coote and Iain Stewart taking out the title in their Mazda 323 4WD.  Four-wheel drive vehicles dominated the series signalling the end of any chances of two wheel drive vehicles being competitive.  The Alpine Rally was not included in the year's events, and the Esanda Rally in the ACT was only included at the last minute after the cancellation of the Queensland rally round due to withdrawal of Police permission to use Shire Roads.

Season review
The 21st Australian Rally Championship was held over four events across Australia, the season consisting of one event each for Tasmania, Western Australia, New South Wales and Australian Capital Territory.

The Rallies
The four events of the 1988 season were as follows.

Round One – APPM/TT-Line Rally Tasmania

Round Two – BP Visco Forest Rally

Round Three – 2EC Bega Valley Rally

Round Four – Esanda Finance Rally of Australia

1988 Drivers and Navigators Championships
Final pointscore for 1988 is as follows.

Murray Coote – Champion Driver 1988

Iain Stewart – Champion Navigator 1988

References

External links
  Results of Snowy Mountains Rally and ARC results.

Rally Championship
Rally competitions in Australia
1988 in rallying